The Andorran Permanent representative to the United Nations Office at Vienna has his residence in Andorra La Vella and is also accredited as Ambassador to the governments in Vienna (Austria), San Marino, Prague (Czech Republic), Bratislava (Slovakia), Bucharest (Romania) Budapest (Hungary) and is head of delegation of the Principality of Andorra next to the Organization for Security and Co-operation in Europe and representative of Andorra to the Preparatory Commission of the Comprehensive Nuclear-Test-Ban Treaty Organization.

List of heads of mission

References 

Austria
Andorra
Andorra